The Fix Tape  is an album by Gunplay. The album was released on Cleopatra Records in August 2017.

Track listing 
Track listing adapted from iTunes.

References 

2017 albums